The Badush Dam is an unfinished multi-purpose dam on the Tigris River, located near Badush,  northwest of Mosul in the Ninawa Governorate, northern Iraq.

If completed, the dam's designed main purpose is to provide protection from a failure of the unstable Mosul Dam upstream. In addition, the hydroelectric power station would have an installed capacity of 170 MW and the dam would further regulate tailwaters from Mosul Dam.

History
In response to concerns over Mosul Dam's karst foundation, Iraqi's Ministry of Irrigation began construction in 1988. Works on the dam ended in 1991 due to economic sanctions against Iraq. Other problems troubled construction as well, particularly lethal gas exhalation. Significant construction on the dam along with the hydro-power unit housing had occurred. The dam is roughly 40 percent complete.

Current project
Concerns over the stability of the Mosul Dam significantly contributed to recent efforts to restart construction of the Badush Dam, and possibly expand it as well.

As early as December 2005, Iraq's Ministry of Water Resources was developing a project to restart construction on the dam.  Currently, it would cost about US$300 million to complete the initial design but the Government of Iraq is wary of spending an additional US$10 billion to expand the dam's size in order to help mitigate a potential failure of the Mosul Dam.

The current project contains a main earth-fill dam with an inclined clay core and other random fills, two saddle dams (earth-fill dams) at the left bank and a  concrete dam (hollow buttress type) at the right bank. The concrete dam includes eight bottom outlets, a spillway and four power intakes and conduits, a stilling basin, headrace and tailrace channels. There is a power house, close to the concrete dam. The bottom outlets, power station and spillway combined afford a discharge capacity of 

The  allowance between the normal and maximum is for flood protection from a Mosul Dam collapse. At its maximum level the Badush reservoir can hold , enough to absorb and pass a Mosul Dam wave, according to a wave study.

References

External links

Dams in Iraq
Dams on the Tigris River
Hydroelectric power stations in Iraq
Nineveh Governorate
Geography of Iraqi Kurdistan
Proposed hydroelectric power stations
Proposed renewable energy power stations in Iraq